Joseph Walter Estabrook (May 19, 1944 in Kingston, New York – February 4, 2012 in Houston, Texas) was an American prelate of the Roman Catholic Church who served as an auxiliary bishop of the Archdiocese for the Military Services and also Titular Bishop of Flenucleta.

Biography

Early life and education
Joseph Estabrook attended St. Bonaventure University (in Olean, New York), the Seminary of Christ the King (in East Aurora, New York), where he earned a Master's degree in Divinity, and the Jesuit School Of Theology (Berkeley, California).

Ordination and ministry
Estabrook was ordained to the priesthood by Bishop Edwin Broderick on May 30, 1969. He then served as associate pastor at St. Vincent de Paul Parish in Albany until 1970, and as director of the Diocesan Family Life Bureau from 1970 to 1977.

Military chaplain
Estabrook entered the chaplaincy of the United States Navy on July 4, 1977, and then served as chaplain at the Naval Hospital in Jacksonville, Florida until 1978. He served at Naval Station Mayport (1978–1980) and at Marine Corps Base Quantico (1980–1982) before studying at the Armed Forces Staff College in Norfolk, Virginia. He worked in recruitment and endorsing at the Navy Chief of Chaplains Office from 1983 to 1986.

Estabrook was a chaplain aboard the USS Carl Vinson from 1986 to 1988, whence he was transferred to the US Naval Hospital in Oakland, California. From 1988 to 1989, he studied ethics at the Jesuit School of Theology at Berkeley. He was a chaplain at the Naval Air Station Sigonella (1989–1991) and a basic course officer at the Navy Chaplain School aboard Naval Education and Training Command in Newport, Rhode Island (1991–1994) before serving as Executive Assistant to the Navy Chief of Chaplains at the Department of Navy from 1994 to 1997. He served as U.S. Pacific Fleet Chaplain aboard Naval Station Pearl Harbor from 1997 to 2000, and served at Marine Corps Base Kaneohe Bay, Hawaii from 2000 to 2004.

Auxiliary Bishop for the Military Services
 
On May 7, 2004, Estabrook was appointed Auxiliary Bishop of the Armed Forces and Titular Bishop of Flenucleta by Pope John Paul II. He received his episcopal consecration on the following July 3 from Archbishop Edwin O'Brien, with Bishops Howard Hubbard and William Weigand serving as co-consecrators, at the Basilica of the National Shrine of the Immaculate Conception.

He retired from the Navy on June 17, 2004, as Captain. He was awarded two Meritorious Service Medals and Navy Commendation Medals, and three Legion of Merit Medals. He was Fourth Degree Knight of Columbus and a Knight of the Holy Sepulchre.

Death
Estabrook died in Houston, Texas on February 4, 2012, aged 67.

See also

 Catholic Church hierarchy
 Catholic Church in the United States
 Historical list of the Catholic bishops of the United States
 Insignia of Chaplain Schools in the US Military
 List of Catholic bishops of the United States
 List of Catholic bishops of the United States: military service
 Lists of patriarchs, archbishops, and bishops
 Military chaplain
 Religious symbolism in the United States military
 United States military chaplains
 United States Navy Chaplain Corps

References

External links
 Archdiocese for the Military Services, USA, official website
 Archdiocese for the Military Services of the United States. GCatholic.org. Retrieved 2010-08-20.

Episcopal succession

1944 births
2012 deaths
21st-century American Roman Catholic titular bishops
United States Navy chaplains
Chaplains
Jesuit School of Theology at Berkeley alumni
Joint Forces Staff College alumni
People from Kingston, New York
Recipients of the Legion of Merit
St. Bonaventure University alumni
Knights of the Holy Sepulchre
Catholics from New York (state)